The 33rd Yukon Legislative Assembly commenced on October 12, 2011 after Yukon voters returned a majority Yukon Party government under the leadership of Darrell Pasloski. The Yukon NDP became the official opposition while the Liberals took third place status.

The membership in this Legislature increased by one seat after the boundary redistribution.

Leadership changes
After losing opposition status in the general election and going from five seats to two, the Liberal party has been beset with leadership issues. Former leader Arthur Mitchell resigned after being defeated in the redistricted Copperbelt North riding. He was replaced by interim leader Darius Elias who left the leadership position and the caucus on August 17, 2012. By default Sandy Silver became leader of the party as the sole remaining MLA. Silver officially became party leader on March 1, 2014.

Dissolution

The 33rd Legislature was dissolved on October 7, 2016, with a general election called for November 7, 2016. The Yukon Party was defeated and the Yukon Liberal Party under Sandy Silver formed a majority government. Pasloski lost his own seat and the New Democrat caucus was reduced to third party status.

Members at Dissolution

Standings changes since the 2011 general election

Membership changes

References

External links
Yukon Legislature

Yukon Legislative Assemblies
Lists of people from Yukon
Yukon politics-related lists